WDJY-LP (99.1 FM) is a radio station licensed to serve the community of Dallas, Georgia. The station is owned by Hype Media Global Inc. It airs a talk radio format.

The station was assigned the WDJY-LP call letters by the Federal Communications Commission on February 13, 2014.

References

External links
 Official Website
 

DJY-LP
DJY-LP
Radio stations established in 2015
2015 establishments in Georgia (U.S. state)
Talk radio stations in the United States
Paulding County, Georgia